The  engine was a 14-cylinder, air-cooled, two-row radial engine of 1870 hp. At some 44.9 litres (2,740 in²) displacement, it was one of the largest-displacement 14-cylinder radial engines in the world, rivalling the similar configuration Allies' American Wright Twin Cyclone engine of 42.7 litre (2,600 in²) and Soviet Shvetsov ASh-82 engine of 41.2 litre (2,515 in²) displacement levels, and was meant to compete with early 18-cyl engines. The Nakajima model designation for this engine was NAK while it was an experimental project, in service it was known as the NK7, and known as the Ha-103 by the Army and  "Mamori" or "Mamoru" by the Navy. According to unified designation code it was Ha-36.
The meanings of these two Japanese words are very similar, Mamori translates as protection and Mamoru, translates as to guard, protect, defend and obey.

The competitor of successful Mitsubishi Kasei engine, the Mamoru proved to be unreliable and was rarely able to operate near its design power. Designs based on the Mamoru were forced to use other engines, typically the less powerful Mitsubishi Kasei or the Nakajima Homare. Production of the Mamoru was ended by the Navy after only a few hundred production examples were built.

Design and development
The Mamoru was Nakajima's seventh air-cooled design, which led to its designation: N for Nakajima,  K for air-cooled, 7 for the 7th design, and A for the major model number. Two sub-models were built with minor changes, the Model 11 for the Navy, and the Model 12 for the Army. Both produced 1,850 hp

The first application of the Mamoru was on the first prototype of the G5N1 Genzan. The G5N1 had been designed on the basis of the Douglas DC-4E as Japan's first four-engine bomber, and proved to be a disappointment. These problems were compounded by the unreliability of the early Mamoru engines, which had to be de-tuned and left the G5N1 underpowered. The G5N1's maiden flight was on 10 April 1941, and a further four prototypes were built with the Mamoru. In an attempt to salvage the project, two additional airframes were fitted with 1,530 hp Mitsubishi MK4B 12 "Kasei" engines and redesignated G5N2s. Although the Mitsubishi engines were more reliable than the original Mamoru 11s, further development was halted. Of the six completed Shinzans, four of them (two G5N2s and two G5N1s re-engined with the Kasei 12) were relegated for use as long-range Navy transports under the designation Shinzan-Kai Model 12 Transport G5N2-L.

The Nakajima Mamoru was also used on the Nakajima B6N Tenzan (heavenly mountain) carrier based attack aircraft. The Navy requested this aircraft based on the Kasei, but Nakajima's Kenichi Matsumara insisted on using their Mamoru. The B6N first flew on 14 March 1941, demonstrating several problems, notably the poor engine reliability. With the delay of 2 years, by 1943 the engine had improved to the point where serial production was allowed to start, but after only 133 B6N1s had been delivered the Navy ordered the switch to the 1,850 hp (1380 kW) Mitsubishi MK4T Kasei 25. The rest of the 1,268 B6N2s were Kasei powered.

Variants
 Mamoru 11 NK7A
 Mamoru 12 Ha-103
As NK7A

Applications
 Nakajima B6N 1 X 1,870 hp (1395 kW) Nakajima NK7A Mamoru 11
 Nakajima G5N 4 X  1,870 hp (1395 kW) Nakajima NK7A Mamoru 11
 Nakajima Ki-49 2 X 1,870 hp Nakajima Ha-103
 Mitsubishi Ki-67 (prototype) 2 X 1,870 hp Nakajima Ha-103

Specifications (Nakajima NK7A Mamoru type 11, 12 )

See also

References

Notes

Bibliography
 Francillon, Ph.D., René J. Japanese Aircraft of the Pacific War. London: Putnam & Company, 2nd edition 1979. . pg 425

External links

Nakajima aircraft engines
1940s aircraft piston engines
Aircraft air-cooled radial piston engines